Berea is a city in Cuyahoga County in the U.S. state of Ohio and is a western suburb of Cleveland. The population was 19,093 at the 2010 census. Berea is home to Baldwin Wallace University, as well as the training facility for the Cleveland Browns and the Cuyahoga County Fairgrounds. Also near Berea is the Cleveland Hopkins International Airport.

History

Berea was established in 1836. The first European settlers were originally from Connecticut. Berea fell within Connecticut's Western Reserve and was surveyed and divided into townships and ranges by Gideon Granger, who served as Postmaster General under President Thomas Jefferson.  Abram Hickox, a Revolutionary War veteran, bought the first plot in what is today Middleburg Heights and in 1808 traveled west from Connecticut to his new purchase. Dissuaded by the swampy and heavily forested land he decided to settle in Cleveland. He became successful as Cleveland's first full-time blacksmith. His plot of land was sold to his nephew, Jared Hickox, who came to the area with his wife Sarah and family in 1809. They followed an ancient Indian highway down through the forest from Cleveland and then, at what is now the corner of Bagley and Pearl roads, began to hack their way directly west. About two miles in they found Granger's plot markers and set up their homestead. Today this area is a strip mall on Bagley Road, just down the road from Berea. At the time Hickox discovered Granger's plot markers, the area was a swampy lowland and, as fate would have it, the Hickox's two grown up sons died from typhoid fever shortly after the family's arrival. The family farm was in dire straits, having been so severely depleted of male laborers. Love came to the rescue, however; and the area's spirits were lifted by its first marriage, that of Jared's daughter Amy Hickox to a recent arrival, Abijah Bagley. Bagley ended up taking over the farm and managing it into a successful concern. Today, Berea's largest street bears his name.

In 1827, educator John Baldwin moved to Middeburg Township where he joined forces with James Gilruth and Henry Olcott Sheldon, Methodist circuit preachers who wanted to form an ideal Christian community. In 1836, they pledged to pool all their properties to create a Utopian "Community of United Christians." Members of the Community vowed to avoid all luxuries and temptations that would prevent them from achieving the Methodist ideal of "sanctification," or perfect love of God. In 1836, Baldwin and the others of the Utopian Community tried to think of a name for their new town. Nehemiah Brown proposed Tabor (perhaps from the biblical Mount Tabor), but Henry Sheldon suggested Berea, citing the biblical Berea in the Acts 17:10-11. They decided to let God decide the Community's place name by flipping a coin, and the coin came up Berea. Financial disputes led to the dissolution of the Community and the departure of James Gilruth within a year. John Baldwin and Henry Sheldon then teamed up with Josiah Holbrook, the founder of the American Lyceum movement for adult and community education, to found the Berea Seminary, a central instructional facility for Lyceum teachers, and a Lyceum Village composed of community members dedicated to creation of an educated population. The Lyceum Village concept never caught on in Berea due to the 1838 Public School Act, but the idea of an ideal community centered around a school continued even after the Berea Seminary closed. 
The failure of these two Utopian experiments left John Baldwin and Henry Sheldon in deep debt. However, Baldwin had since 1838 been making grindstones from sandstone in the creek bed of the Rocky River. In the 1840s, Henry Sheldon began selling them via the Erie Canal in New York State. This was the beginning of the Berea quarrying industry. After the Big Four Railroad was built from Cleveland to Cincinnati, Baldwin built a railroad to connect his quarries to the Big Four Depot. 

In 1845, Baldwin convinced the North Ohio Conference of the Methodist Church to charter a new school: a new Utopian venture of sorts, because the new school, the Baldwin Institute, would provide education to all, regardless of sex, race, religious creed, or ability to pay. In 1855, it was renamed Baldwin University.  By the 1880s, the quarries had begun to intrude on the site of the university.  In 1891, the school broke ground for a new campus at Front Street and Bagley Road.  New buildings were constructed and old buildings were moved. In 1866, James Wallace purchased the site of the Lyceum Village from the German Children's Home to become the German Wallace College Campus.  In 1913, Baldwin University and German-Wallace College merged to become Baldwin–Wallace College, now Baldwin Wallace University. Berea High School was the town's first high school, founded in 1882.

Berea sandstone

The geological stratum on which the city rests is the sedimentary formation Berea sandstone, a geological formation named after the city which extends across Ohio, eastern Pennsylvania, and northern Kentucky.  This comprises a sandstone laid down during the early Mississippian.  In the 19th and early 20th century, this formation was extensively quarried, with the quarries eventually displacing the original main street of the town, as well as the original location of Baldwin University, which sold its five-acre campus to the quarries for $100,000 in 1888, moving to a new location to the north.

After beginning of quarrying of the Berea sandstone in the 1830s, Baldwin initially shipped grindstones to Cleveland by ox carts, and later the quarries were connected to the railroad by a spur line. Berea proclaims itself "The Grindstone Capital of the World". The town's symbol is a grindstone, a tribute to the many grindstones that came out of its quarries.

The quarries also provided sandstone that was extensively used as a construction material, in the form of Berea dimension stone. Huge amounts of it came from Berea, and were used architecturally in many important buildings. The quarries closed in the late 1930s, when concrete came into wide use for construction. Several lakes in the area are former quarry pits that have been allowed to fill with water, including Baldwin, Wallace and Coe lakes.

Geography
Berea is located at  (41.369950, -81.862591). It is located south/southwest of Brook Park and west of Middleburg Heights.

The east branch of the Rocky River runs through Berea, providing its water supply for most of the year. The Cleveland Metroparks' Rocky River and Mill Stream Run reservations run through the city.

Congressional district
Since January 3, 2013, Berea has been split between two congressional districts, lying partly in Ohio's 16th congressional district and partly in Ohio's 9th congressional district. The 9th district has been called "The Mistake by the Lake" and one of the "Top 5 Ugliest Districts" due to gerrymandering.

Demographics

2010 census
As of the census of 2010, there were 19,093 people, 7,471 households, and 4,390 families residing in the city. The racial makeup of the city was 88.8% White, 6.6% African American, 0.2% Native American, 1.5% Asian, 0.6% from other races, and 2.3% from two or more races. Hispanic or Latino of any race were 2.8% of the population.

There were 7,471 households, of which 25.6% had children under the age of 18 living with them, 43.7% were married couples living together, 11.4% had a female householder with no husband present, 3.7% had a male householder with no wife present, and 41.2% were non-families. 33.9% of all households were made up of individuals, and 11.5% had someone living alone who was 65 years of age or older. The average household size was 2.26 and the average family size was 2.90.

The median age in the city was 37.1 years. 18.3% of residents were under the age of 18; 17.8% were between the ages of 18 and 24; 22.9% were from 25 to 44; 27% were from 45 to 64; and 13.9% were 65 years of age or older. The gender makeup of the city was 47.7% male and 52.3% female.

2000 census
As of the census of 2000, there were 18,970 people, 7,173 households, and 4,468 families residing in the city. The population density was 3,475.9 people per square mile (1,341.5/km2). There were 7,449 housing units at an average density of 1,364.9 per square mile (526.8/km2). The racial makeup of the city was 91.48% White, 5.13% African American, 0.24% Native American, 0.90% Asian, 0.03% Pacific Islander, 0.61% from other races, and 1.61% from two or more races. Hispanic or Latino of any race were 1.59% of the population.

There were 7,173 households, out of which 34.9% had children under the age of 65 living with them, 48.1% were married couples living together, 10.6% had a female householder with no husband present, and 37.7% were non-families. 32.3% of all households were made up of individuals, and 12.1% had someone living alone who was 65 years of age or older. The average household size was 2.35 and the average family size was 3.00.

In the city, the population was spread out, with 21.5% under the age of 18, 16.2% from 18 to 24, 26.3% from 25 to 44, 21.7% from 45 to 64, and 14.3% who were 65 years of age or older. The median age was 36 years. For every 100 females, there were 90.4 males. For every 100 females age 18 and over, there were 86.2 males.

The median income for a household in the city was $45,699, and the median income for a family was $59,194. Males had a median income of $39,769 versus $29,078 for females. The per capita income for the city was $21,647. About 2.6% of families and 5.5% of the population were below the poverty line, including 4.1% of those under age 18 and 7.8% of those age 65 or over.

Education
The Berea City School District serves not just Berea but also the neighboring cities of Brook Park and Middleburg Heights. Berea–Midpark High School is in Berea, and Berea-Midpark Middle School is in Middleburg Heights. The high school and middle school partners with Polaris Career Center for Project Lead The Way classes. There are three elementary schools: Grindstone (in Berea), Brook Park (in Brook Park), and Big Creek (in Middleburg Heights).

Bach festival
Baldwin-Wallace College is the home of the Riemenschneider Bach Institute, a research institute devoted to J. S Bach.

The first collegiate Bach festival in America was founded in 1932 by music educator Albert Riemenschneider and his wife Selma. The couple had a mission: to enrich the lives of Northeast Ohio residents by bringing the world's greatest Bach soloists to the stage of Baldwin Wallace University, while offering the school's Conservatory students an unparalleled opportunity to experience the highest performance standards of their day.

As Riemenschneider conceived it, the festival would rotate Bach's four major works – the Mass in B minor, the St. John Passion, the St. Matthew Passion and the Christmas Oratorio – every four years in sequence. Since the inception of the Festival, Baldwin Wallace students perform the major choral and orchestral works with a cast of internationally renowned vocal soloists, faculty and local professionals.

Notable people

 Jacob M. Appel (born 1973), novelist
 Albert E. Baesel (1890–1918), Medal of Honor recipient
 John Baldwin (1799–1884), founder of Berea and of Baldwin Institute, which later became Baldwin–Wallace University
 Charles Bassett (1931–1966), NASA astronaut
 Tim Beckman (born 1965), former head football coach at University of Illinois and University of Toledo
 Mike Buddie (born 1970), MLB player for New York Yankees and Milwaukee Brewers
 Bud Collins (1929-2016), sportswriter and TV commentator, member of International Tennis Hall of Fame
 Lou Groza (1924–2000), former placekicker and offensive tackle for Cleveland Browns, NFL Hall of Famer, Has a street named after him.
 Norb Hecker (1927–2004), football player and coach
 Geoffrey Landis (born 1955), award-winning science-fiction author and NASA scientist
 Nancy McArthur, children's author
 Neil H. McElroy (1904–1972), former U.S. Secretary of Defense
 Rob Mounsey (born 1952), composer, music producer and musician
 Jim Richter (born 1958),  football player
 Tom Schmitz (born 1968), keyboardist for metal band Mushroomhead
 Herbert Schneider (1892-1984), philosopher
 Chris Scott, NFL player
 Theodore Stearns (1881-1935), composer, born in Berea
 Alex Stepanovich (born 1981), professional football player
 John-Michael Tebelak (1949–1985), wrote and directed award-winning Broadway musical Godspell
 Christina Tosi (b. 1981), chef and cookbook author, founder and owner of Milk Bar
 Jim Tressel (born 1952), president of Youngstown State University, head football coach at Ohio State
 Lee Tressel (1925–81), head football coach at Baldwin-Wallace University, member of College Football Hall of Fame
 James Wallace (1821–85), quarry owner, donated to Baldwin Institute, leading to foundation of German Wallace College; former mayor of Berea

National Register of Historic Places
Baldwin-Wallace College North Campus Historic District
Baldwin-Wallace College South Campus Historic District
Berea District 7 School
Berea Union Depot
Buehl House
Lyceum Village Square And German Wallace College
John Wheeler House
George W. Whitney House

Gallery

References

Notes

Citations

Sources

External links

 City of Berea official website
 The Advertiser, Berea newspaper, 1868-1873

 
Cities in Cuyahoga County, Ohio
Cities in Ohio
Cleveland metropolitan area
Populated places established in 1836
1836 establishments in Ohio